WKZX-FM (93.5 FM is a radio station broadcasting a Regional Mexican format. Licensed to Lenoir City, Tennessee, it serves the Knoxville, Tennessee area.

History
Arthur Wilkerson, owner of WLIL (730 AM), applied for an FM frequency on June 16, 1967. The Federal Communications Commission granted the construction permit on September 1 of that year, and WLIL-FM signed on at 93.5 on September 19, partially simulcasting the AM frequency. It was the second attempt at FM radio from WLIL; Wilkerson had shut down the first, which operated at 100.3—later 100.5—MHz from 1952 to 1955, because he felt if WSM couldn't make a go of it in Nashville, he could not in Lenoir City.

In addition to his radio stations, Wilkerson owned a lumber mill and built custom homes. He served as president of the Tennessee Association of Broadcasters. Wilkerson was also a pilot and restaurant owner.

Wilkerson died in 1998. Two years later, B.P. Broadcasters purchased WLIL-AM-FM, which at the time ran country music formats, for $1 million. B.P. built a new FM tower in the Glendale community near the Loudon-Blount county line. The call letters of the FM station were changed to WKZX-FM on September 20, 2000, and the station changed formats to adult contemporary.

In 2004, WKZX-FM flipped to Regional Mexican.

References

External links
www.laliderwkzx.com/

KZX-FM
Radio stations established in 1967
1967 establishments in Tennessee
Regional Mexican radio stations in the United States
KZX-FM